Col de la Croix de Mounis (elevation ) is a mountain pass in the Parc naturel régional du Haut-Languedoc in southern France. In July 2013, the col was crossed on stage 7 of the Tour de France.

Location
The col is located on the D922 road between Saint-Gervais-sur-Mare and Lacaune on the slopes of the Espinouse mountains.

Details of the climb
The climb starts at the village of Andabre, where the road leaves the valley of the River Mare.

Tour de France
The Col de la Croix de Mounis has been crossed three times in the Tour de France bicycle race. On the first occasion, in 1953, the pass was descended en route from Albi to Béziers when it was not categorised. In 1972, the col was ranked Category 3, as it was descended en route from Castres to la Grande-Motte.

In 2013, the col was climbed from the south-east for the first time, on Stage 7 between Montpellier and Albi, when it was ranked as a Category 2 climb. The first rider over the summit was Blel Kadri.

References

External links

Col de La Croix de Mounis on "climbbybike" website

Landforms of Hérault
Mountain passes of Occitania (administrative region)
Mountain passes of the Massif Central